Mehak Gul (born 2000) is a Pakistani chess player. She earned the FIDE title of Woman Candidate Master (WCM) at the 42nd Chess Olympiad. She is the youngest Pakistani to achieve this title She also holds the world record for arranging a chessboard in forty five seconds.

Professional career 
At the age of six Gull learnt to play chess. She secured third and fifth position at the Punjab Chess Championship in June 2012 and National Chess Championship respectively. Coached by her father she first participated in international chess event at the age of twelve, when she represented Pakistan at 40th Chess Olympiad held at Istanbul. She participated in 42nd Chess Olympiad held at Baku, Azerbaijan. Gul won six of the eleven matches she played and was titled Woman Candidate Master. She represented her school at Little Master Chess Tournament in November 2016 and earned the third spot.

References

External links 
 
 
 

2000 births
Living people
Pakistani female chess players